Beckert is a surname. Notable people with the surname include:

Franz Beckert (1907–1973), German gymnast who competed in the 1936 Summer Olympics
Glenn Beckert (1940–2020), American baseball player
Jens Beckert (born 1967), German sociologist
Lothar Beckert (born 1931), German long-distance runner
Patrick Beckert (born 1990), German Olympic speed skater
Stephanie Beckert (born 1988), German speed skater
Sven Beckert,  American historians and Laird Bell Professor of American History at Harvard University
Tom Beckert, American sound engineer

See also
Groz-Beckert, is part of the Groz-Beckert Group based in Albstadt-Ebingen in Baden-Wuerttemberg, Germany

References

German-language surnames